The 1890 Minnesota gubernatorial election took place on November 4, 1890. Republican Party of Minnesota incumbent William Rush Merriam defeated Democratic Party of Minnesota challenger Thomas Wilson and Farmers' Alliance candidate Sidney M. Owen.

Results

See also
 List of Minnesota gubernatorial elections

External links
 http://www.sos.state.mn.us/home/index.asp?page=653
 http://www.sos.state.mn.us/home/index.asp?page=657

Minnesota
Gubernatorial
1890
November 1890 events